Sir Christopher Leaver  (born 3 November 1937) is a British wine merchant, businessman, and politician who was the 654th Lord Mayor of London in 1981–1982. He is the son of Dr Robert Leaver and was educated at Eastbourne College. 

Leaver served as Alderman for Dowgate City (1974–2002), as Sheriff of the City of London (1979), and as Lord Mayor of London (1981–82). He is also a Justice of the Peace. He was knighted as a Knight Grand Cross in 1981 and appointed as a member of the KStJ in 1982.

Other
He appeared as a castaway on the BBC Radio programme Desert Island Discs on 13 February 1982.

Private
He married Mireille Molyneux Benton in 1975. They have a son and two daughters.

References

External links
 Image of Leaver in Lord Mayor's regalia

1937 births
Living people
Knights Grand Cross of the Order of the British Empire
20th-century lord mayors of London
20th-century English politicians
Sheriffs of the City of London
Place of birth missing (living people)
English justices of the peace